The Bible is a canonical collection of texts treated as religious scripture in Judaism, Christianity, Islam and other religions.  

Bible or The Bible may also refer to:

Film and television
 The Bible: In the Beginning, a 1966 Italian-American religious epic film
 Wakefield Poole's Bible!, or simply Bible!, a 1973 American softcore pornographic film
 The Bible (TV series), a 2013 American religious television miniseries
 The American Bible Challenge, a 2012 American religious game show

Literature
 Any book or written work that is considered authoritative in its field, e.g., the 1978 programming book The C Programming Language is often referred to as "the bible of C programming"
 Bible (screenwriting), a reference document for screenwriters to ensure consistency within an ongoing television production 
 Rubber Bible, an informal name for the 1914 reference book CRC Handbook of Chemistry and Physics
 Doom Bible, an original design document written by Tom Hall for 1993 game Doom

Music
 The Bible (band), a 20th- and 21st-century English rock band known for their songs "Graceland" and "Mahalia"
 The Holy Bible (album), a 1994 studio album by the Welsh alternative-rock band Manic Street Preachers

People
 Alan Bible (1909–1988), an American politician
 Bible John,  unidentified British serial killer
 Dana X. Bible (1891–1980), an American athlete, coach, and administrator
 Lee Bible (1886–1929), a race-car driver notable for land-speed record attempt

Other

 Another name for the omasum, the third compartment of the stomach in ruminants
 Bible Hill, Nova Scotia, a village in Colchester County, Nova Scotia, Canada
 Bible Grove (disambiguation), multiple towns in the United States

See also

 Bibleman, American Christian direct-to-video children's series (1995–2010)
 Scripture (disambiguation)